St. Lawrence County Public Transportation was a transit bus service in St. Lawrence County, New York.  It was the main function of Roethel Coach Lines (founded in 1969).  Roethel is now a FedEx affiliate and no longer runs commuter bus services.

Bus services

Route 1
The first route operated between Ogdensburg and Potsdam, and sometimes onto Norwood and Norfolk.  It made stops in:
Heuvelton
Rensselaer Falls
Canton--State University of New York at Canton; transfer with Trailways of New York
Potsdam--Canton-Potsdam Hospital, State University of New York at Potsdam

Route 2
The second route only operated on Tuesdays and Fridays.  It also traveled from Ogdensburg to Potsdam, but used alternate routing through Flackville

Route 3
This third route had some variety in it, sometimes running from Ogdensburg to Hogansburg via Potsdam, and sometimes from Ogdensburg to Potsdam via Hogansburg.  Notable stops, running in the Ogdensburg-Hogansburg direction, were as follows:
Flackville
Canton
Potsdam
Norwood
Norfolk
Raymondville
Massena--Akwesasne Mohawk Casino

Shuttles

Ogdensburg Shuttle
Serving Ogdensburg, Waddington, Morristown and Lisbon.

Potsdam Shuttle
Serving the Village of Potsdam, Parishville and Norwood.

References

Bus transportation in New York (state)
Transportation in St. Lawrence County, New York